San Francisco shooting or San Francisco massacre may refer to:

 San Francisco riot of 1877, that killed 4 people, all of whom were Chinese on July 23, 1877

 Golden Dragon massacre, a mass shooting that killed 5 people and injured 11 others in Chinatown on September 4, 1977
 101 California Street shooting, a mass shooting that killed 8 people and injured 6 others on July 1, 1993
 San Francisco UPS shooting, a mass shooting that killed 3 people and injured 5 others in the neighborhood of Potrero Hill on June 14, 2017